Theresa Makone is the former Zimbabwe Minister of Public Works. She is the Member of House of Assembly for Harare North (MDC-T).

References

Year of birth missing (living people)
Living people
Members of the National Assembly of Zimbabwe
Government ministers of Zimbabwe
Movement for Democratic Change – Tsvangirai politicians
Women government ministers of Zimbabwe
Female interior ministers
Public works ministers of Zimbabwe
21st-century Zimbabwean women politicians
21st-century Zimbabwean politicians